Blaxland is a rural locality in the Western Downs Region, Queensland, Australia.

Geography 
The Western railway line forms the southern boundary of the locality, while Myall Creek forms the northern boundary.

The land is flat and predominantly used for cropping.

History 
In the 1860s Edward James Blaxland purchased land originally known as Three Mile Scrub and named the property Blaxland. When the Western railway line reached the area in 1868, the railway station was called Blaxland.

Education 
There are no schools in Blaxland. The nearest primary schools in neighbouring Dalby and Bowenville. The nearest secondary schools are in Dalby.

References 

Western Downs Region
Localities in Queensland